Ognen is a village in Karnobat Municipality, in Burgas Province, in southeastern Bulgaria.

Honours
Ognen Cove on Trinity Peninsula, Antarctica is named after the village.

References

Villages in Karnobat Municipality